An  degree is an academic degree awarded by one university or college to an alumnus of another, in a process often known as incorporation. The recipient of the  degree is often a faculty member at the institution which awards the degree, e.g. at the University of Cambridge, where incorporation is expressly limited to a person who "has been admitted to a University office or a Headship or a Fellowship (other than an Honorary Fellowship) of a College, or holds a post in the University Press ... or is a Head-elect or designate of a College".

Although an  degree is not an earned degree, both the original degree(s) and the incorporated (ad eundem) degree(s) are given in post-nominals listed in the Oxford University Calendar.

In earlier times it was common, when a graduate from one university moved into the neighborhood of another, for the new university to admit the graduate as a courtesy, "at the same degree" (in Latin). Thus if someone was a bachelor of arts in the university that they had attended, they would likewise be a bachelor of arts of their new university. (Not every college extended this courtesy to all other colleges, however.)
The practice of incorporation diminished in the early 19th century, but it continues at the University of Oxford, the University of Cambridge, and Trinity College Dublin.
At the University of Oxford, incorporation first appears in the University Statutes in 1516, though the practice itself is older: In the 15th and early 16th centuries, incorporation was granted to members of universities from all over Europe. This continued until the 19th century, when in 1861 incorporation was restricted to members of Cambridge University and Trinity College, Dublin. In 1908, incorporation was further restricted to specific degrees from these universities.

A number of female students at Oxford and Cambridge were awarded ad eundem University of Dublin degrees at Trinity College, Dublin, between 1904 and 1907, at a time when their own universities refused to confer degrees upon women.

In the United States, the  Master of Arts as a regularly awarded academic qualification generally dates from the colonial period, and was awarded at a number of institutions including Harvard, Yale, University of Pennsylvania, Princeton, Columbia, and Williams. It faded out gradually, sometime during the Civil War at Columbia, in 1874 at Yale, and in 1884 at Princeton.

Several US universities, including Harvard, Yale, Brown, Amherst and Wesleyan, follow a tradition that only alumni may be tenured faculty, and in limited cases preserve the tradition of the ad eundem Master of Arts . Faculty of those universities who are granted tenure (or in some cases become full professors) but do not already hold an earned degree from the institution that employs them are therefore awarded an honorary master's degree ut in grege nostro numeretur ("so that (s)he may be numbered in our flock", as these degrees are described at Harvard). Yale refers to this degree as the "M.A. Privatim" and at Wesleyan University it is called "MA ad eundem gradum". This tradition began at Wesleyan somewhat more recently, in 1894.

At Amherst College the granting of a Master of Arts degree by the college to its faculty occurs even though the college itself grants only bachelor's degrees (AB) to its matriculated students.

At Brown and Harvard the degrees are awarded to those faculty who are granted tenure and the rank of associate professor, while at Amherst, Wesleyan, and Yale the degrees are conferred only upon those who rise to the rank of full professor. Because these degrees do not involve any further study, most faculty members do not list them on their curricula vitae, although some choose to do so given the exclusivity of the degree. Finally, the location of these ceremonies varies. At Amherst, the degrees are awarded during first year convocation in August, while at Yale it is an "elegant, brief ceremony, usual in February or March." During the 150th anniversary of Princeton University, 16 full professors were awarded the M.A. Privatum, though this seems to be a singular event and not an ongoing part of campus tradition there. At Wesleyan, in recent years, the degrees have been awarded as a part of the annual May commencement ceremony.

Rhodes University in South Africa uses the term  to give a student status to undertake a research higher degree based on experience, as opposed to an explicit qualification. In this case the student does not acquire a qualification, but is exempt from an entry requirement. In yet another variation, the University of Sydney may confer an ad eundem gradum degree on a retiring staff member (academic or otherwise) who has had at least 10 years' service and is not a Sydney graduate, though in this case, the Sydney award is at the same level as an existing qualification.

See also
Master of Arts (Oxbridge and Dublin)

References

Academic degrees